Pakistan Civil Aviation Authority Football Club or Civil Aviation Authority Football Club, commonly referred as PCAA or PCAA F.C. is a Pakistani football club based in Lahore, Punjab. The club is affiliated with Pakistan Civil Aviation Authority and plays their home games at Punjab Stadium. On 16 September 2018, the club won promotion to 2018–19 Pakistan Premier League, after winning a single-legged promotional playoff against Asia Ghee Mills 1–0, as Saeeb Babar scored the goal in 88th minute. The club also played in 2018 National Challenge Cup, losing 5–1 to Pakistan Petroleum in the third-place match.

History

Formation
The club was formed in 2017, before the start of 2018 National Challenge Cup, along with Pakistan Petroleum and Asia Ghee Mills. All the clubs were formed to take part in first ever football tournament in Pakistan since 2016 PFF Cup.

2018–19 season

National Football Challenge Cup
Civil Aviation Authority played their first game on 28 April 2018, against Sindh Government Press in the opening match at All Brothers Football Stadium, Karachi. The Aviation Authority won 3–1. On 2 May 2018, Aviation Authority did a major upset after defeating six times and defending champions, Khan Research Laboratories 1–0 in final match of the group stage with an 86th-minute goal from winger Zaid Umer. In the quarter-finals, Aviation Authority defeated newly formed Asia Ghee Mills 2–1. They faced eventual winners Pakistan Airforce in the semi-finals, after getting the lead in the 44th minute through Saeed A. Aziz, Aviation Authority conceded the goal in 77th minute. The match went on to penalties after it ended 1–1 in the extra time. Pakistan Airforce won the 4–3 on penalties. Aviation Authority faced newly formed Pakistan Petroleum in the third-place match, which they lost 5–1.

Pakistan Premier League
Aviation Authority won promotion after winning the one-legged promotional play-off against Asia Ghee Mills 1–0. On 28 September 2018, Aviation Authority played their first top-flight match against newly promoted Sui Southern Gas to a 0–0 draw. Aviation Authority's first loss of the season was against National Bank in the second match day on 1 October 2018. On 27 October 2018, Aviation Authority did a major upset in the league, after drawing 2–2 with WAPDA away at Punjab Stadium. Their first victory came in the match day 10, on 4 November 2018, defeating Afghan Chaman 2–0. On 13 December 2018, Aviation Authority recorded their biggest victory after defeating relegation bound Baloch Nushki 6–1, with full-back Muhammad Naeem scoring five goals. On 20 December, Aviation Authority did a major upset by defeating WAPDA 2–0. Three days later, they defeated first placed Pakistan Airforce. On 30 December, they defeated Karachi Port Trust 5–2 away, the victory confirmed the relegation of Karachi Port Trust for the first time Pakistan Premier League. Their last match of the season was a 1–0 over former champions Pakistan Army.

Coaching staff

First team squad

Statistics

Season-by-season

Team records
Statistics below are for all-time leaders as of 30 July 2019.

Most goals

Most appearances

References

External links
 PCAA

Football clubs in Pakistan
Association football clubs established in 2017
2007 establishments in Pakistan
Works association football clubs in Pakistan
Football in Lahore